Music of Life is a British independent hip hop and dance music label formed in 1986 by two influential DJ remixers Froggy and Simon Harris, managed by Chris France. Following several successful productions, one of which reached No. 3 in the UK Singles Chart (the Real Thing's "You to Me Are Everything") Harris and Froggy decided to launch their own label, they were offered a label deal by Morgan Khan (Streetwave) and the first release was a remix by the duo of Cerrone's 'Supernature'  (his 'Music of Life' song was the inspiration for the label name). Within a few months Froggy left the label and Streetwave went out of business. Harris being active in remixing and production for many other artists and labels financed the label with his remix income. After the demise of Streetwave Harris and France decided to re-launch as a British hip-hop music label. Music of Life opened an office in London's Soho at 22 Hanway Street, Chris France and his sister Michelle spent their days in the busy Soho office whilst Simon could usually be found in his home studio 'The Bunker' producing many of the Music of Life releases.

At first, the label licensed new rap music from US production company Powerplay for the first compilation album Def Beats 1 but as an addition to the US material Harris produced an extra track, under his own 'Music of Life Productions' recorded in London by the label's A&R man Derek Boland. 'Rock the Beat' by Derek B created a demand for British hip-hop and the demo tapes started to arrive, Music of Life signed the best artists instead of licensing more US material and Harris produced many new songs featuring artists including M.C. Duke, The Demon Boyz (Million Dan), Thrashpack, Asher D and Daddy Freddy, CJ Macintosh & Einstein, She Rockers (Betty Boo), Hijack, First Frontal Assault and many more.

Many of these recordings broke ground and are still considered to be very highly innovative, the first reggae/hip-hop combination (Asher D & Daddy Freddy's 'Ragamuffin Hip Hop') and Derek B's album were  licensed to US label 'Profile' (Run DMC), Hijack was signed to Ice-T's Rhyme syndicate label and many more. Music Week wrote that Music of Life was "the most successful hip hop label in the UK right now", in 1988. Record Mirror identified Music of Life as one of the few hip hop labels "to believe in home grown talent". In 1989, Studio Week magazine called Music of Life "the foremost rap label in this country at the moment."

So far the Music of Life catalog of recordings and copyrights under Music of Life Productions and released on many labels worldwide including Music of Life have exceeded 2000 titles and include music videos and documentary TV shows ('Kings of Rap' – MTV).

Music of Life is one of the UK's longest running independent dance music labels (1986–present day) and the catalog has been licensed and released in over 70 countries with many chart hits including the UK, Germany, Japan, France and the USA (Harris's 'Bass' how low can you go? was a No. 1 Billboard US chart hit) and many Grammy award-winning artists (Luthor Vandross, REM, Beastie Boys, Beck) have licensed from the Music of Life catalog.

Sister label Living Beat was launched in 1989 and released many dance music, house and pop recordings with chart success including "Supermarioland" reaching No. 6 on the UK Singles Chart with Harris's AKA 'Ambassadors of Funk' in association with Nintendo, Samantha Fox's Song for Europe entry "Go for the Heart" and was instrumental in helping Prince achieve his first UK No. 1 single with "The Most Beautiful Girl in the World".

Harris also produced the world's best selling series of breakbeat albums used by DJs and producers, Beats Breaks and Scratches in 12 volumes and worked with artists Norman Cook (Fatboy Slim), Paul Oakenfold, Afrika Bambaataa and George Clinton to produce and release similar albums that are part of the Music of Life catalog. Music of Life is now a registered trademark.

Artists roster
The Music of Life catalog includes songs from:

MC Duke & DJ Leader 1
Thrashpack
She Rockers (featuring Betty Boo)
Daddy Freddy
Asher D
Tenor Fly
Nitty Gritty
Derek B
Hijack
Hardnoise
3 Knights
DJ Daddy
Leslie Lyrics
Norman Cook
Paul Oakenfold
George Clinton
Simon Harris (label founder)
Einstein
Ambassadors of Funk
Afrika Bambaataa
Demon Boyz
Professor Griff
Clyde Stubblefield
Killa Instinct
S.L. Troopers
First Frontal Assault
Kobalt 60
Overlord X
DJ Supreme (Hijack)

See also 
 Lists of record labels

References

External links
 Music of Life official site

British record labels
Record labels established in 1986
British hip hop record labels
IFPI members
British hip hop
Grime music
Drum and bass record labels
1986 establishments in the United Kingdom

de:Britischer Hip-Hop
es:Hip hop británico